Carolina Telechea i Lozano (born 9 August 1981) is a Catalan lawyer and politician from Spain. He is a member of the Congress of Deputies of Spain.

Early life and family
Telechea was born on 9 August 1981 in Igualada, Catalonia. She has a diverse family background - Andalusian, Argentine, Basque and Extremaduran. Her father was from Madrid while her mother was from Cáceres. Both parents worked in the textile industry and in the 1990s her father founded a computer company. She has two younger sisters who are twins. Telechea has a degree in law from the University of Barcelona and a postgraduate degree in legal practice from the Barcelona Bar Association.

Telechea's family were socialists and supporters of federalism. Her father was a Socialists' Party of Catalonia (PSC) councillor in Santa Margarida de Montbui in the 1980s. Telechea was a member of the PSC for six years and was secretary of the Anoia branch of the Socialist Youth of Catalonia (JSC). However, the failure of the socialists to prioritise federalism led to Telechea leaving the PSC in 2010.

Career
Telechea has been a practicing lawyer since 2006, specialising in criminal law. Whilst working as a co-ordinator for the socialist mayor of Santa Margarida de Montbui she was dismissed when she became pregnant. She sued and with the compensation she won she formed her own law firm in 2011.

In 2015 Telechea was approached by the nationalist Republican Left of Catalonia (ERC) to contest the local elections. She contested the 2015 local elections as a Republican Left of Catalonia–Acord Municipal (ERC-AM) electoral alliance candidate in Igualada and was elected.

At the 2016 general election Telechea was placed sixth on the Republican Left of Catalonia–Catalonia Yes (ERC–CatSí) electoral alliance's list of candidates in the Province of Barcelona but the alliance only managed to win five seats in the province and as a result she failed to get elected. However, in June 2018, she was appointed to the Congress of Deputies following the resignation of Ester Capella. She was re-elected at the April 2019 and November 2019 general elections.

Personal life
Telechea is married to a Mossos d'Esquadra police officer and has a son, Jules.

Electoral history

Notes

References

External links

1981 births
Lawyers from Catalonia
Women politicians from Catalonia
Women lawyers from Catalonia
Living people
Members of the 12th Congress of Deputies (Spain)
Members of the 13th Congress of Deputies (Spain)
Members of the 14th Congress of Deputies (Spain)
Municipal councillors in the province of Barcelona
People from Igualada
Republican Left of Catalonia politicians
University of Barcelona alumni
Women members of the Congress of Deputies (Spain)